Do Overs and Second Chances is the second EP by American rock band Go Radio. It was released April 20, 2010 on Fearless. The EP was originally planned to be only 5 tracks, however, Go Radio returned to the studio in early 2010 to record two more additional tracks.

In 2010, Do Overs and Second Chances sold more than 15,000 copies in the U.S. The track "Goodnight Moon" was later included in the deluxe edition of Lucky Street (2011).

Track listing
All tracks written by Jason Lancaster, except where noted.

"When Dreaming Gets Drastic" (Jason Lancaster, Zack Odom, Kenneth Mount) – 3:17
"Thanks for Nothing" – 3:24
"Letters and Love Notes" (Alex Reed) – 3:20
"It's Not a Trap, I Promise" – 3:20
"In Our Final Hour" – 3:21
"You Hold Your Breath, I'll Hold My Liquor" – 3:14
"Goodnight Moon" – 5:06

Chart positions

Personnel
Jason Lancaster – Lead vocals, piano, rhythm guitar
Alex Reed – Lead guitar, backing vocals
Matt Burns – Bass guitar, backing vocals
Steven Kopacz – Drums, percussion, backing vocals

References

External links

Do Overs and Second Chances at YouTube (streamed copy where licensed)

2010 EPs
Go Radio EPs
Fearless Records EPs